Anastasiya Kirpichnikova (born 24 June 2000) is a Russian swimmer. In 2019, she represented Russia at the 2019 World Aquatics Championships held in Gwangju, South Korea. She competed in the women's 800 metre freestyle and women's 1500 metre freestyle events. In both events she did not advance to compete in the final. She also participated at the 2020 Summer Olympics in the women's 1500m, 800m, and women's swimming marathon.

References

External links
 

2000 births
Living people
Russian female swimmers
Place of birth missing (living people)
Swimmers at the 2015 European Games
Swimmers at the 2020 Summer Olympics
European Games medalists in swimming
European Games gold medalists for Russia
European Games silver medalists for Russia
European Games bronze medalists for Russia
Russian female freestyle swimmers
European Aquatics Championships medalists in swimming